Nikolai or Nikolay Baskakov may refer to:

 Nikolai Baskakov (linguist) (1905–1995), Soviet linguist
 , Soviet forester, Hero of Socialist Labour
  (1903–1977), Soviet Greco-Roman wrestler
 Nikolai Baskakov (painter) (1918–1993), Soviet portrait artist